Prib may refer to:

 Edgar Prib (born 1989), German-Russian football player
 PRIB, Pattern Recognition in Bioinformatics, international computer science conference